Achilles Statius (or Aquiles Estaço) (12 June 1524, Vidigueira – 17 September 1581) was a Portuguese humanist and writer, since 1555 living in Rome, where he was a secretary of the pope. Achilles Statius is now mostly known from his extensive Latin commentary to Catullus, published in 1566.

Works

References 

1524 births
1581 deaths
People from Vidigueira
Portuguese Renaissance writers
Portuguese Renaissance humanists
16th-century Portuguese people